Dehati may refer to:

 the name of a dialect of Maithili, Awadhi and possibly other languages of India
 a composition by Ravi Shankar
 Dehati (Shadmehr Aghili album)